Hiệp An is a ward of Thủ Dầu Một in Bình Dương Province, Vietnam.

References

Populated places in Bình Dương province